The 1948 All-Southwest Conference football team consists of American football players chosen by various organizations for All-Southwest Conference teams for the 1948 college football season.  The selectors for the 1948 season included the Associated Press (AP) and the United Press (UP).  Players selected as first-team players by both the AP and UP are designated in bold.

All Southwest selections

Backs
 Doak Walker, SMU (UP-1) (1948 Heisman Trophy; College and Pro Football Halls of Fame)
 Clyde Scott, Arkansas (UP-1)
 Lindy Berry, TCU (UP-1)
 Ray Borneman, Texas (UP-1)

Ends
 James Williams, Rice (UP-1)
 Morris Bailey, TCU (UP-1)

Tackles
 George Petrovich, Texas (UP-1)
 R. P. Tinsley, Baylor (UP-1)

Guards
 Bentley Jones, Baylor (UP-1)
 Odell Stautzenberger, Texas A&M (UP-1)

Centers
 Dick Harris, SMU (UP-1)

Key
AP = Associated Press

UP = United Press

Bold = Consensus first-team selection of both the AP and UP

See also
1948 College Football All-America Team

References

All-Southwest Conference
All-Southwest Conference football teams